Paul McDonald Calvo (born July 25, 1934) is a Guamanian politician who served as the 3rd Governor of Guam from 1979 to 1983. Before his accession to the governorship, Calvo served as the Guam Legislature from 1971 to 1975. He is a member of the Republican Party of Guam.

Early life
Calvo was born in Agaña, Guam, and is the eldest son of Eduardo "Jake" Torres Calvo (1909–1963) and Veronica Mariano McDonald (1913–2009). His only two brothers and two sisters-in-law are Edward (1936–2004), Thomas (1940–2015) and Frances Matias Calvo. His paternal grandparents were Attorney Don Tomas Anderson Calvo and Doña Regina Martinez Torres. His maternal grandparents were John Francis McDonald and Dolores Mariano. He attended George Washington High School in Guam. He then attended the Peacock Military Academy and Santa Clara University.

Political career
He embarked on a business career in his family's insurance company in 1958, and entered politics during the 1960s as a member of the Republican Party. He was elected as a senator in the Legislature of Guam in 1965, and during his three terms in the body served as chair of the government Committee on Finance and Taxation and parliamentary leader of the Republican Party. Calvo was elected governor in 1978, and served until 1982.

Calvo-Palomo Campaign (1974)
Calvo teamed up with Senator Tony Palomo to challenge the incumbents, Gov. Carlos Camacho and Lt. Gov. Kurt Moylan. The Calvo-Palomo ticket's attacks on the administration included charges of corruption and favoritism, and the primary election was so close – Camacho-Moylan won by only 261 votes – that Calvo-Palomo decided to run as a write-in team for the general election. While Calvo-Palomo lost in the general election, they forced a runoff election to be held between Camacho-Moylan and the Democratic team of Ricardo J. Bordallo and Rudy Sablan. Camacho-Moylan lost the runoff, and afterward Carlos Camacho retired from politics and gave control of the Republican Party to Calvo.

Governorship (1979–1983)
During his first year as governor, Calvo reduced the government of Guam's deficit by $27 million, but the deficit continued to climb for the rest of his term due mainly to long-standing problems with tax collections.

Guam's economy began to regain health under Calvo's administration, as he sought to attract new businesses to Guam, including a tuna-fishing fleet, a garment manufacturer, and hotel construction. Visitor arrivals also registered sharp increases.

But Calvo's term as governor was marred by the teacher's strike of 1981, which lasted many months and caused deep divisions in Guam's education system. He lost to Bordallo-Reyes Campaign in the 1982 election and decided to retire from politics. Although he has never run for office since, Calvo remains strongly influential in Republican politics, as its senior statesman, and his son Eddie Baza Calvo was one of the most popular senators in I Liheslaturan Guåhan/the Guam Legislature and was elected governor of Guam in 2010 along with running mate Ray Tenorio.

Personal life
Calvo's wife is Rose Baza Calvo. They have eight children. Calvo's son Eddie Calvo, is a politician and former Governor of Guam.

Electoral history

References

External links
 Paul M. Calvo at Guampedia.com
 Paul McDonald Calvo at nga.org

|-

1934 births
Chamorro people
Governors of Guam
Guamanian businesspeople
Guamanian Republicans
Living people
Members of the Legislature of Guam
People from Hagåtña, Guam
Republican Party governors of Guam
Santa Clara University alumni